West Independence is an unincorporated community in Hancock County, in the U.S. state of Ohio.

History
West Independence was laid out in 1849 on the Findlay—Tiffin road. A post office called West Independence was established in 1854, and remained in operation until 1908.

References

Unincorporated communities in Hancock County, Ohio
Unincorporated communities in Ohio